The Kaltenbach is a river of Saxony, Germany. It is a left tributary of the White Elster, which it joins near Pöhl.

See also
List of rivers of Saxony

Rivers of Saxony
Rivers of Germany